Thor Odinson is a character appearing in American comic books published by Marvel Comics. Created by artist Jack Kirby, writer Stan Lee, and scripter Larry Lieber, the character first appeared in Journey into Mystery #83 (August 1962), debuting in the Silver Age of Comic Books. Thor is based on the Norse mythological god of the same name. He is the Asgardian god of thunder, whose enchanted hammer Mjolnir enables him to fly and manipulate weather, among his other superhuman attributes. A founding member of the superhero team the Avengers, Thor has a host of supporting characters and enemies.

Thor has starred in several ongoing series and limited series, and appears in all volumes of the Avengers series. The character has been used in Marvel Comics merchandise, animated television series, films, video games, clothing and toys.

Chris Hemsworth portrays the character in several Marvel Cinematic Universe films: Thor (2011), The Avengers (2012), Thor: The Dark World (2013), Avengers: Age of Ultron (2015), Doctor Strange (2016, cameo), Thor: Ragnarok (2017), Avengers: Infinity War (2018), Avengers: Endgame (2019), and Thor: Love and Thunder (2022). Alternative versions of the character appear in the Disney+ series What If...? (2021).

Publication history

The Marvel Comics superhero Thor debuted in the science fiction/fantasy anthology title Journey into Mystery #83 (cover-date August 1962), and was created by editor-plotter Stan Lee, scripter Larry Lieber, and penciller-plotter Jack Kirby. A different version of the mythological Thor had appeared previously in Venus #12–13 (February–April 1951). Lee in 2002 described Thor's genesis early in the Marvel pantheon, following the creation of the Hulk:

In a 1984 interview Kirby said "I did a version of Thor for D.C. in the fifties before I did him for Marvel. I created Thor at Marvel because I was forever enamored of legends, which is why I knew about Balder, Heimdall, and Odin. I tried to update Thor and put him into a superhero costume, but he was still Thor." The story was included in Tales of the Unexpected #16, from 1957; and although the character had a different design, some details would be reused by Kirby when he created the Marvel Comics version. And in a 1992 interview, Kirby said "[I] knew the Thor legends very well, but I wanted to modernize them. I felt that might be a new thing for comics, taking the old legends and modernizing them."

Subsequent stories of the 13-page feature "The Mighty Thor" continued to be plotted by Lee, and were variously scripted by Lieber or by Robert Bernstein, working under the pseudonym "R. Berns". Various artists penciled the feature, including Jack Kirby, Joe Sinnott, Don Heck, and Al Hartley. With Journey into Mystery #101 (Feb. 1964), the series began a long and definitive run by writer and co-plotter Lee and penciler and co-plotter Kirby that lasted until the by-then-retitled Thor #179 (Aug. 1970).

Lee and Kirby included Thor in The Avengers #1 (Sept. 1963) as a founding member of the superhero team. The character has since appeared in every subsequent volume of the series.

The five-page featurette "Tales of Asgard" was added in Journey into Mystery #97 (Oct. 1963), followed by "The Mighty Thor" becoming the dominant cover logo with issue #104 (May 1964). The feature itself expanded to 18 pages in #105, which eliminated the remaining anthological story from each issue; it was reduced to 16 pages five issues later. Comics historian Les Daniels noted that "the adventures of Thor were gradually transformed from stories about a strange-looking superhero into a spectacular saga." Artist Chic Stone, who inked several early Thor stories, observed that "Kirby could just lead you through all these different worlds. The readers would follow him anywhere."

Journey into Mystery was retitled Thor (per the indicia, or The Mighty Thor per most covers) with issue #126 (March 1966). "Tales of Asgard" was replaced by a five-page featurette starring the Inhumans from #146–152 (Nov. 1967–May 1968), after which featurettes were dropped and the Thor stories expanded to Marvel's then-standard 20-page length. Marvel filed for a trademark for "The Mighty Thor" in 1967 and the United States Patent and Trademark Office issued the registration in 1970.

After Kirby left the title, Neal Adams penciled issues #180–181 (Sept.-Oct. 1970). John Buscema then became the regular artist the following issue. Buscema continued to draw the book almost without interruption until #278 (Dec. 1978). Lee stopped scripting soon after Kirby left, and during Buscema's long stint on the book, the stories were mostly written by Gerry Conway, Len Wein, or Roy Thomas. Thomas continued to write the title after Buscema's departure, working much of the time with the artist Keith Pollard; during this period Thomas integrated many elements of traditional Norse mythology into the title, with specific stories translated into comics form. Following Thomas's tenure, Thor had a changing creative team.

In the mid-1970s, Marvel considered giving the character a second series as part of parent company Magazine Management's  line of black-and-white comics magazines. A story written by Steve Englehart for the aborted project appeared in Thor Annual #5 (1976). A black-and-white Thor story appeared in Marvel Preview #10 (Winter 1977).

Walt Simonson took over both writing and art as of #337 (Nov. 1983). His stories placed a greater emphasis on the character's mythological origins.  Simonson's run as writer-artist lasted until #367 (May 1986), although he continued to write – and occasionally draw – the book until issue #382 (Aug. 1987). Simonson's run, which introduced the character Beta Ray Bill, was regarded as a popular and critical success. Simonson's later stories were drawn by Sal Buscema, who describes Simonson's stories as "very stimulating. It was a pleasure working on his plots, because they were a lot of fun to illustrate. He had a lot of great ideas, and he took Thor in a totally new direction." Asked why he was leaving Thor, Simonson said that he felt the series was due for a change in creative direction, and that he wanted to reduce his work load for a time. After Simonson's departure, Marvel's editor-in-chief at the time, Tom DeFalco, became the writer. Working primarily with artist Ron Frenz, DeFalco stayed on the book until #459 (Feb. 1993).

The character of Thor was involved in the year-long Marvel Super Heroes Secret War storyline written by Jim Shooter from May 1984 to April 1985, following his mysterious disappearance in The Mighty Thor #341 and The Mighty Avengers #242.

As a consequence of the "Heroes Reborn" crossover story arc of the 1990s, Thor was removed from mainstream Marvel continuity and with other Marvel characters re-imagined in an alternate universe for one year. The Thor title reverted to Journey into Mystery with issue #503 (Nov. 1996), and ran four different, sequential features ("The Lost Gods"; "Master of Kung Fu"; "Black Widow", and "Hannibal King") before ceasing publication with #521 (June 1998).

When the character was returned to the mainstream Marvel Universe, Thor was relaunched with Thor vol. 2, #1 (July 1998). As of issue #36, the title used dual numbering in a tribute to the original Thor series, and the caption box for said issue became #36 / #538 (June 2001). The title ran until issue #85 / #587, dated December 2004. Dan Jurgens wrote the first 79 issues, with Daniel Berman and Michael Avon Oeming completing the series.

The third volume debuted as Thor #1 (Sept. 2007), initially written by J. Michael Straczynski and penciled by Olivier Coipel. Beginning with what would have been vol. 3, #13 (Jan. 2009), the third volume reverted to issue #600, reflecting the total number of published issues from all three volumes. Kieron Gillen took over from Straczynski in Thor #604 with artists Billy Tan, Richard Elson and Dougie Braithwaite, with his final storyline finishing in issue #614. Matt Fraction took over the series with issue #615, after having been announced as starting in Thor #610 and #611.

To coincide with the Thor film, Marvel launched a number of new series starring the character in mid-2010. These included Thor: The Mighty Avenger by Roger Langridge and Chris Samnee, Thor: First Thunder by Bryan J. L. Glass and Tan Eng Huat, Thor: For Asgard by Robert Rodi and Simone Bianchi, and Iron Man/Thor by the writing duo of Dan Abnett and Andy Lanning.

In April 2011, Thor once again reverted to its original title of Journey into Mystery with issue #622, reuniting writer Gillen and artist Braithwaite in a series of stories starring Thor's adopted brother, Loki. An ongoing series, titled The Mighty Thor, launched the same month with writer Fraction and artist Coipel. The series ended with issue #22 in October 2012.

In October 2012, Thor became a regular character in Uncanny Avengers, beginning with issue #1. The following month, an ongoing series titled Thor: God of Thunder by writer Jason Aaron and artist Esad Ribić debuted as part of the Marvel NOW! relaunch. This story arc was voted as the eighth best Thor story by Comicbook.com.

In October 2014, a fourth volume of Thor by Jason Aaron and artist Russell Dauterman debuted that featured a female character (later revealed to be Jane Foster) in the role of Thor after the classic hero is no longer able to wield Mjolnir. Aaron stated that "this is not She-Thor. This is not Lady Thor. This is not Thorita. This is Thor. This is the Thor of the Marvel Universe. But it's unlike any Thor we've ever seen before." The following October, Aaron and Dauterman signed an exclusive agreement with Marvel to continue their work together in a second volume of The Mighty Thor, also starring Foster.

In July 2016, Marvel announced a new ongoing series titled The Unworthy Thor by Aaron and Coipel. The series follows the original Thor, who now refers to himself as Odinson, as he tries to find his purpose after relinquishing his name and title to Foster. Aaron stated that the series finds Odinson in a dark place explaining, "He failed for a reason we still don't quite understand. He dropped the hammer and hasn't been able to pick it up since. So then we go to a pretty dark place. A darker, more desperate, more driven version."

In January 2020, Thor volume #6 debuted, written by Donny Cates. This story follows Thor, as he becomes the new king of Asgard and tries to fulfill his duties as a king while fighting his destiny in an attempt to save the multiverse from an unknown threat.

Fictional character biography

1960s

Thor's father Odin decides his son needed to be taught humility and consequently incarnates Thor (without memories of godhood) on Earth as a mortal, partially disabled human medical student, Donald Blake. After becoming a doctor, Blake witnesses the arrival of an alien scouting party while he is on vacation in Norway. Blake flees from the aliens into a cave. After discovering Thor's hammer Mjolnir (disguised as a walking stick) and striking it against a rock, he transforms into the thunder god. Later, in Thor #159, Blake is revealed to have always been Thor, Odin's enchantment having caused him to forget his history as The Thunder God and believe himself mortal.

Defeating the aliens, Thor shares a double life with his alter ego: treating the ill in a private practice with nurse – and eventual love – Jane Foster, and defending humanity from evil. Thor's presence on Earth almost immediately attracts the attention of his adoptive brother and enemy Loki. Loki is responsible for the emergence of three of Thor's principal foes: the Absorbing Man; the Destroyer, and the Wrecker. On one occasion, Loki's tactics were accidentally beneficial – although successful in using an illusion of the Hulk to draw Thor into battle, it results in the formation of the superhero team the Avengers, of which Thor and Hulk, alongside Ant-Man, the Wasp and Iron Man, would be founding members. Thor's other early foes include Zarrko, the Tomorrow Man; the Radioactive Man; the Lava Man; the Cobra; Mister Hyde; the Enchantress and the Executioner, and the Grey Gargoyle.

Falling in love with Jane Foster, Thor disobeys his father and refuses to return to Asgard, an act for which he is punished on several occasions. Thor's natural affinity for Earth is eventually revealed to be due to the fact that he was the son of the Elder Goddess Gaea. Although Thor initially regards himself as a "superhero" like his teammates in the Avengers, Loki's machinations draw Thor into increasingly epic adventures, such as teaming with his father Odin and Asgardian ally Balder against the fire demon Surtur and Skagg the Storm Giant, and defeating an increasingly powerful Absorbing Man and proving his innocence in the "Trial of the Gods". This necessitates an extended leave of absence from the Avengers.

Thor encounters the Greek God Hercules, who becomes a loyal and trustworthy friend. Thor saves Hercules from fellow Olympian Pluto; stops the advance of Ego the Living Planet; rescues Jane Foster from the High Evolutionary and defeats his flawed creation, the Man-Beast. Odin finally relents and allows Thor to love Jane Foster, on the proviso she pass a trial. Foster panics and Thor intervenes. After Foster fails the test, Odin returns her to Earth, where she is given another chance at love, while a heartbroken Thor is introduced to the Asgardian warrior Sif. Thor battles the Asgardian troll Ulik for the first time when Ulik attempts to steal Mjolnir. The thunder god returns to Asgard to prevent Mangog from drawing the Odinsword and ending the universe, Thor learns the origin of Galactus and rescues Sif after she is kidnapped by Him.

1970s
Thor battles Surtur once again when the fire demon attempts to storm Asgard; encounters the Stranger and his pawn the Abomination; and overpowers an outmatched Doctor Doom.

In the fall of 1972, writers Gerry Conway, Steve Englehart, and Len Wein crafted a metafictional unofficial crossover spanning titles from both major comics companies. Each comic featured Conway, Englehart, and Wein, as well as Wein's first wife Glynis, interacting with Marvel or DC characters at the Rutland Halloween Parade in Rutland, Vermont. Beginning in Amazing Adventures vol. 2 #16 (by Englehart with art by Bob Brown and Frank McLaughlin), the story continued in Justice League of America #103 (by Wein, Dick Dillin and Dick Giordano), and concluded in Thor #207 (by Conway and penciler John Buscema).

Thor prevents another attempt by Mangog — disguised as Odin — from drawing the Odinsword; is saved by the intervention of ally Volstagg when the "Odin Force" became a semi-sentient destructive force; and is rescued from death when Odin engineers a false Ragnarök and has reporter Red Norvell die in his place battling the Midgard Serpent. Thor met the Eternals in a lengthy storyline. Thor also encounters the "Eye of Odin" (sacrificed by Odin to drink from the Well of Mimir) which claimed another Asgard and version of Thor once existed.

1980s

Thor eventually confronts the threat of the Celestial Fourth Host, and after an extended series of encounters learns of the apparent true origin of Asgard and Odin's plans to defend Earth from the alien judges. Despite the attempt by Odin to stop the Celestials by occupying the Destroyer armor (now 2,000 feet tall as holding the life essence of every Asgardian) and wielding the Odinsword (and aided by the Uni-Mind, an entity composed of the Eternals) and Thor himself, the aliens depart when presented with an offering by Gaea on behalf of the "Skymothers" (e.g. Frigga and Hera) of twelve perfect humans. Thor also learns Gaea was his birth mother.

After restoring the Asgardian gods with a gathering of energies donated by Skyfathers from other pantheons, Thor has a series of adventures on Earth, including encountering two Heralds of Galactus in swift succession; stopping Mephisto from taking human souls; clearing his name when framed by Asgardian god of war Tyr; aiding Drax the Destroyer; with ally Iron Man defeating the Bi-Beast and the Man-Beast; engaging the former king of Nastrond Fafnir transformed by Odin into a dragon in combat when freed by Loki, and battling Dracula. Thor learns of the existence of the "God Eater", a creature summoned when the death gods of several pantheons temporarily merge their realms. Thor thwarts the creature – revealed to be in humanoid guise Atum, the son of Gaea, and therefore Thor's half-brother – and ensures the cosmic balance is restored.

While exploring an approaching space vessel at the request of Nick Fury, Thor encounters Beta Ray Bill, who after a brief battle, proved himself worthy of lifting Thor's hammer Mjolnir. After initial misunderstandings, Bill forms an alliance with the Asgardian gods, and is empowered by Odin to aid Thor and his allies in a war with an approaching army of demons, which is revealed to be led by fire demon Surtur, now wielding "Twilight", the gigantic "Sword of Doom". After a series of extended battles – including a battle to the death with Fafnir and thwarting the Dark Elf Malekith — the gods are finally triumphant, although during combat Odin and Surtur disappear through a rift and are presumed dead.

Thor remains in Asgard to deal with the vacuum left by Odin's apparent death, and drives off Hela; meets Tiwaz, his great-grandfather; forces Loki to cure him from the effects of a love potion; with allies enters Hela's realm and rescues lost mortal souls. Returning to Earth, Thor and Beta Ray Bill defeat the transformed Dark Elf Kurse, although Loki uses the power of Surtur's discarded sword to change Thor into a frog. After an adventure in Central Park, Thor manages to partially restore himself and then forces Loki to reverse the spell. While rescuing X-Factor member the Angel from torture by the mercenary team the Marauders, Thor is cursed by Hela, who makes his bones as brittle as glass and unable to heal if damaged; and renders him truly immortal and unable to die no matter how severe his injuries. Thor is injured again during a battle with the Absorbing Man engineered by Loki, and is ultimately saved by Loki during a battle with the Dark Elves.

Eventually forced to wear armor to protect his broken body, Thor and Loki defeat a group of Ice Giants, who seek revenge by trying to locate the Midgard Serpent, hoping it would kill the thunder god. The Giants instead find the dragon Fin Fang Foom, who is revealed to be the Midgard Serpent in disguise. Time slows as the pair – mortal enemies due to prophecy that stated they would kill each other during Ragnarök — battle to the death. Thor kills the Serpent, although his body is completely pulverized. Loki restores the Destroyer, who kills the Ice Giants and finds Thor's now liquid form. The Destroyer attempts to disintegrate the thunder god but can not do so due to Hela's curse. Thor assumes mental control of the Destroyer, and forces Hela on pain of death to restore his true form. The thunder god then breaks Loki's arm as punishment for his actions. Thor meets and battles Leir, the Celtic god of lightning. After another encounter with the Celestials on an alien world; Thor finds Odin — a captive of Seth — and uses the Odinpower to fend off a returning Surtur; and defeats Annihilus while Asgard is in the Negative Zone. Thor battles X-Men foe the Juggernaut and meets the New Warriors.

1990s
After Thor kills Loki in single combat, Heimdall – standing in for Odin temporarily as ruler of Asgard – banishes Thor from Asgard; he is replaced by the mortal Eric Masterson, who became the hero Thunderstrike. When Odin awakes, Thor is forgiven and returned. During a battle Thor is driven into a "warrior's madness" by a Valkyrie. After overpowering everyone who attempts to stop his rampage, Thor is brought by the Eternal and Thanos before Odin, who cures his son of the madness.

Thor, together with the Avengers, the Fantastic Four, and other heroes, is trapped in an alternate universe after defeating the villain Onslaught. The heroes live alternate lives for a year in what is revealed to be an artificial creation until returning to their own universe. Thor and several members of the Avengers battle the Destroyer. Thor is saved by an enigmatic being called Marnot, who binds the life-force of a mortal called Jake Olson to the thunder god. Thor enters into a war with the Dark Gods with Marnot revealed to be Hescamer, one of Odin's ravens; and battles the returning Enchanters Three.

2000s

Thor faces a prolonged struggle against Thanos when he seeks to remake the universe. When Odin dies in battle against Surtur, Thor becomes ruler of Asgard. The thunder god extends his rule to Earth, with major repercussions. Thor and the Asgardians slay or imprison those who oppose them, including a young religious mutant called Davis; Zarrko the Tomorrow Man; Perrikus of the Dark Gods; the U.S. Government, and even his fellow Avengers. Thor marries Amora (the Enchantress), and has a son, Magni, who upon reaching adulthood doubts his father's judgment. Wracked with guilt, Thor is drawn into battle with his former ally Tarene and the Destroyer (occupied by former foe Desak), and reverses these events via time travel.

When the timeline is reset, Loki revives Surtur, who forges new Uru hammers for Loki's Storm Giant followers and begins Ragnarök. Thor learns that Ragnarok was the result of the self-styled "gods to the gods" known as Those Who Sit Above in Shadow, who feed on the cycle. Thor confronts the Norns (Fates) and severs the tapestry of Asgard's existence. After breaking the Ragnarok cycle and being advised by the Odinforce that this was his father's plan, Thor enters into hibernation. With his fate unknown to the Avengers, he is believed to be missing in action.

Thor's hammer Mjolnir is eventually found on Earth and put under United States Army protection. When the supervillain Doctor Doom escapes from Hell, Mjolnir falls through the dimensional plane, and Doom tries unsuccessfully to lift the hammer. Mjolnir then comes into the possession of a man carrying a bag with the initials "D.B". Donald Blake, upon touching the hammer Mjolnir, is transported to the void of non-existence in which Thor resides. Blake explains that when Odin originally removed the Blake persona from Thor, Blake was consigned to the void that Thor now inhabited. With Odin's death, Blake was suddenly restored into being in New York City. Blake convinces Thor to wield Mjolnir once more, return to Earth, and renew the dual identity with Blake. Blake also reveals that Thor's fellow Asgardians still live in the minds and hearts of mortals, and only needed to be found and released. Thor rebuilds Asgard over Broxton, Oklahoma, and learns of the events that occurred during the 2006–2007 "Civil War" storyline, in which the U.S. government passed the Superhuman Registration Act, requiring all persons with superhuman abilities to register with the government or be subject to imprisonment. The superhero community was split over this law, which led to conflict between the two sides. Furthermore, Iron Man, who became the de facto leader and public face of the pro-registration forces, hunted and imprisoned their mutual former comrades who had joined the anti-registration side, led by Captain America. Iron Man and others also used Thor's DNA to create a clone of him to serve him in this campaign, for which Thor is greatly angered. When Iron Man confronts Thor over the latter's bringing Asgard to Oklahoma, and tells him that he himself must register with the government, Thor easily dispatches Iron Man, and tells him that anyone who attempts to approach Asgard uninvited will be dealt with mercilessly. As a compromise to keep the U.S. government from losing face, Iron Man suggests that since Asgard hovers above the ground, it can be regarded as diplomatic embassy or mission separate from the United States and not bound by the Registration Act. Though Thor accepts this, his and Captain America's animosity toward Stark would persist until the conclusion of the 2010–2011 Avengers Prime miniseries. Thor searches for his fellow Asgardians, and restores each of them, with the exception of Sif, who had been trapped in the body of an old woman dying of cancer, her real form stolen by Loki. Thor locates Odin in a limbo between life and death, waging constant battle with Surtur. Odin advises his son that Thor must lead the Asgardians.

During the 2008 "Secret Invasion" storyline, Thor rescues and heals Beta Ray Bill, who after being temporarily given Mjolnir, aids Thor in defending Earth against an invading force of alien Skrulls. Due to Loki's deception, Thor battles and kills his grandfather Bor, and is banished from Asgard. With Thor's hammer Mjolnir damaged in that battle, Thor seeks out Doctor Strange, who is only able to repair the hammer by transferring the Odinforce from Thor to Mjolnir, binding the two in a symbiotic relationship. With the repaired hammer, Thor is able to draw out the imprisoned Sif and return her to her own body, thereby restoring Loki to his male body in the process.

2010s

During the events of the 2010 "Siege" storyline, Thor defends Asgard against an invasion by Norman Osborn and his Dark Avengers. Although the invasion force is ultimately defeated, Asgard itself is toppled by the Sentry, who also kills Loki. Thor then kills the Sentry. Subsequently, the Superhuman Registration Act is repealed and Thor joins the rebranded Avengers, who had come to his aid during the battle. The next day Balder lifts Thor's exile and appoints Thor as his adviser. Immediately after the fall of Asgard, Thor, Captain America and Iron Man are transported to the Norse realm of Hel, where they battle against Hela, after which Thor and Captain America's friendship with Iron Man is renewed.

Thor aids Amadeus Cho in a quest to find the necessary ingredients to bring back their mutual friend Hercules from a parallel universe. During the 2010 - 2011 "Chaos War" storyline, Thor joins Hercules' God Squad to battle the Chaos King, who is set on destroying all of existence. With Asgard in ruins on Earth, the nine worlds are left undefended and are invaded by a force known as "The World Eaters". Seeking counsel on the matter, Thor restores his father Odin and his brother Loki, whom Thor had missed since his death.

During the 2011 "Fear Itself" storyline, Sin frees Odin's long-forgotten brother, Cul, a God of Fear known also as the Serpent, from his underwater prison. Once free, The Serpent dispatches his generals known as the Worthy, each armed with magical uru hammers of their own, to descend the Earth into a state of fear. Although Thor and the Avengers manage to defeat the Serpent and his followers, Thor dies from the injuries he sustains during the battle. At Thor's funeral, Thor and other people's memories of him are replaced by Ulik under the guise of Tanarus, a new thunder god. Thor returns from the limbo of forgotten dead gods with the help of Loki and the Silver Surfer, and vanquishes Ulik.

During the 2012 "Avengers vs. X-Men" storyline, Thor leads the Secret Avengers into deep space to battle the Phoenix Force, but is defeated. He is later captured and taken prisoner by the phoenix-empowered duo of Colossus and Magik. Following the war, Captain America selects Thor to join the Avengers Unity Squad, a new team of Avengers composed of both classic Avengers and X-Men. Thor then investigates the disappearances of several gods, and defeats Gorr the God Butcher in a story arc that spans several millennia.

Following the murder of Uatu and the revelation of his many secrets during the 2014 "Original Sin" storyline, Thor learns that Angela is the daughter of Odin and that she was thought to have been killed during Asgard's war with the Angels of the Tenth Realm. In response, Odin severed the Tenth Realm from the other nine realms and removed all memory of its existence. Thor confronts Frigga about these events and travels to the Tenth Realm with Loki to learn more about his "sister." Later, Nick Fury whispers an unrevealed secret to Thor that causes him to lose the ability to pick up his hammer.

In the aftermath of the "Original Sin" storyline, Thor takes up the battle axe Jarnbjorn as a substitute for Mjolnir and subsequently loses his left arm in combat against Malekith the Accursed. Thor previously used Jarnbjorn as his regular weapon beginning in the ninth century after unable unsuccessful attempts to lift Mjolnir . Composed of Asgardian Steel, Jarnbjorn and Thor fought many foes on Earth, including frost giants, trolls and dragons. However, during the 11th Century, Thor faced off with the Celestial-powered being called Apocalypse and lost. Seeking revenge, Thor blessed Jarnbjorn with his own blood, giving it the power to pierce Celestial armor.

Meanwhile, an unidentified woman, later revealed as Jane Foster, lifts Mjolnir, taking possession of Thor's power. Although Thor initially attempts to reclaim the hammer, he relinquishes the name and role of Thor after witnessing the woman wield its power. Thor Odinson continues his work as a superhero under the name "Odinson", using Jarnbjorn and a prosthetic arm made of black uru.

In the 2016 limited series The Unworthy Thor, Odinson learns that Ultimate Thor's hammer has crash landed on Asgard following the "Secret Wars" storyline. Odinson ultimately turns down the opportunity to lift it and reveals to Beta Ray Bill that the words Nick Fury whispered to him were "Gorr was right," explaining that no god is worthy of mortal admiration. After this, an unknown individual, later revealed as Volstagg, picks up Ultimate Thor's hammer and calls himself "War Thor."

During the 2017 "Secret Empire" storyline, Odinson is recruited by Steve Rogers — who is under the influence of Kobik, the sentient Cosmic Cube — into joining Hydra, but later sides with the resistance in their efforts to end Hydra's control over the United States.

After Odinson learns that Mjolnir's new wielder is Jane Foster, Jane sacrifices Mjolnir to destroy Mangog by wrapping Mangog in chains tied to Mjolnir before hurling both into the sun. After Odinson works with his father to bring Jane back to life, she restarts her chemotherapy while inspiring Odinson to return to his old name, suggesting that he see what kind of Thor he can be without a hammer after witnessing her accomplishments with one. As a result, Thor returns to a variant of his more familiar look with a golden arm, using various substitute hammers until the dwarves can gather enough uru to forge a true new Mjolnir. During the 2019 "War of the Realms" storyline, Thor sacrifices one eye and the last remaining fragment of Mjolnir to gain the necessary knowledge to defeat Malekith, but subsequently manages to channel the cosmic storm generated by their final battle to reforge Mjolnir, restoring his ability to wield the hammer by accepting his past unworthiness and proclaiming that he will now fight for the unworthy.

2020s

Following the "War of the Realms" storyline, Odin names Thor the new King of Asgard in a new ongoing series by writer Donny Cates and artist Nic Klein. Along with the new title, Thor receives a new costume with black body armor, black boots, and a glowing white sash in the form of a Thurisaz rune. In the series, an injured Galactus crash lands on Asgard and claims to be seeking asylum from the cause of his universe's destruction: the Black Winter (Fimbulwinter). Galactus reveals to All-Father Thor that he had a vision of Thor being responsible for his death. In a bid to destroy the Black Winter, Galactus turns Thor into his Herald of Thunder, who will find five particular worlds that Galactus must consume to gain the power to oppose the Black Winter. The transformation into a Herald also restores Thor's lost eye and arm. Thor later learns that the Black Winter considers Galactus as his herald. Outraged at being used, Thor drains Galactus of his energies, leaving him a decimated husk. When the Black Winter moves in to claim Galactus' body, Thor used it as a bomb to decimate the Black Winter.

Prior to the battle with Galactus, Thor had noticed that Mjolnir had been growing heavier for him. After the battle, he sends Mjolnir to Broxton, Oklahoma, where Asgard was once built and later on destroyed. There, a man named Adam Aziz visits the crash site first. He notices that "Call Tony Stark" is written, along with his phone number (which was Thor's revenge for the "Nice throw" Iron Man had previously written on Thor's Hammer), and calls Tony. When Iron Man comes, both him and Adam see that writing on Mjolnir has changed to "Pick it up". Adam picks up the hammer, and his clothes change to more Asgardian like, with a cape and a helmet. Thor soon comes to Broxton, and takes Mjolnir from Adam, but Iron Man snatches it, refusing to return it to Thor until he had run some tests on the hammer and until Thor had answered some questions. Thor replies that he does not answer to anyone, to which Iron Man hit Thor on the face with the hammer. Thor threatens Iron Man, who promptly gives the hammer back. Thor explains to Iron Man that while the hammer has been growing heavier for him, it has been becoming lighter for others. Iron Man promises that he will not tell anyone and goes. Thor goes to Asgard after briefly teaching Adam how to fly using Mjolnir.

In the 2020 Avengers "Enter the Phoenix" story-arc, it is alluded that Thor is the son of a mutant avatar of the Phoenix Force known as Lady Phoenix, who had an affair with Odin 1,000,000 years prior at the dawn of man. However, in a later story in Thor's own comic book, he once again drew upon powers over the Earth inherited by Gaea, as had repeatedly been established earlier, so the veracity of these claims remain very uncertain.

Powers and abilities
Like all Asgardians, Thor is incredibly long-lived and relies upon periodic consumption of the Golden Apples of Idunn to sustain his extended lifespan, which to date has lasted many millennia. Being the son of Odin and the elder goddess Gaea, Thor is physically the strongest of the Asgardians. Thor is capable of incredible feats of strength, such as lifting the almost Earth-sized Midgard Serpent, supporting a weight equivalent to that of 20 planets, destroying Surtur's solar system-sized dimensional portal (by combining his power with that of Beta Ray Bill), and allegedly overpowering infinite gravity. By exerting himself to his maximum, he moved the Worldengine, which held the World Tree, which contains nine universal space-time continuums, and significantly affected their timelines. If pressed in battle, Thor is capable of entering into a state known as the "Warrior's Madness" ("berserkergang" in Norwegian and Danish alike), which will temporarily increase his strength and stamina tenfold, although in this state he attacks friend and foe alike.

Thor is extremely durable to physical injuries. He has even survived energy blasts from Celestials. Thor possesses keen senses that allow him to track objects travelling faster than light and hear cries from the other side of the planet. His stamina allowed him to battle the entire Frost Giant army for nine months without any sustenance or rest; Thor has shown the ability to regenerate wounded portions of his body, including entire limbs or organs, with the aid of magical forces such as Mjolnir. Thor has superhuman speed, agility, and reflexes, enabling him to deflect bullets with his hammer, and to swing or throw it at many times the speed of light. In early stories, Thor demonstrated vortex breath, which produces powerful winds. Like all Asgardians, he has immunity to all Earthly diseases and is resistant to magic. Exceptionally powerful magic can overwhelm Odin's enchantment that transforms him between Asgardian and mortal forms.

As the Norse god of thunder, Thor can summon the elements of the storm (lightning, rain, wind, snow) and uses Mjolnir as a tool to focus this ability, although the hammer cannot command artificial weather, only natural. He can cause these weather effects over the world and destroy entire buildings; by whirling his hammer he can lift entire buildings with the wind. Thor can also create small tornadoes by quickly whipping his cape in circles. As the son of the Earth goddess Gaea, Thor has shown control over the Earth.

Thor is a superb hand-to-hand combatant, and is skilled in armed combat, excelling in the use of the war hammer, sword, axe and mace. Thor possesses two items which assist him in combat: the enchanted Belt of Strength, and his signature weapon, the mystical hammer Mjolnir. The first item doubles Thor's strength and endurance whereas the second is used to control his weather abilities; flight; energy projection and absorption (sufficient to drain the galaxy-destroying Null Bomb, and use its energy to reignite a dying star); dimensional travel; matter manipulation, the Thermo-blast, the Anti-Force (which counteracts another force), and the God Blast, that taps into Thor's life force and has even forced Galactus to flee. Using Mjolnir by throwing it in the desired direction and then holding on to the handle's leather loop, Thor can fly at supersonic speeds within Earth's atmosphere and much faster than light in outer space. He can also use the hammer to create a barrier by letting it spin in a circle, and even managed to contain an explosion powerful enough to destroy 1/5th of the Universe, although at the cost of his own life. He can throw an object out of Earth's atmosphere by using his strength, and throw his hammer to Asgard from which it will return.

When Thor has to transport companions and/or objects to a destination by himself, he has a chariot drawn by two huge mystical goats called Toothgnasher and Toothgrinder that can fly nearly anywhere he desires almost as easily as with Mjolnir.

Mjolnir also has the following powers:
 It can create huge vortices.
 It can emit antimatter particles. 
 It can project mystical blasts of energy, control electromagnetism, and perform molecular manipulation.

It can also absorb energy;
 It drained the Asgardian powers of the Wrecking Crew into the Wrecker. 
 It drained the energies of the villain the Presence.
 It negated the force field of the Juggernaut.

The hammer also accidentally endowed the hero Union Jack with the ability to generate electricity, and it can remove any harmful radiation or toxins from a host.

There are also several rarely used abilities of Mjolnir:
 Tracking a person.
 Locating mystical items.
 Detecting illusions.
 Projecting images, as Thor has shown a glimpse of Asgard to his fellow Avenger Iron Man.

As a former religious relic, Mjolnir is also lethal to the undead, causing creatures such as vampires to burst into flame and crumble to dust.

When in possession of the "Odinforce" that usually empowers his father, Thor has proven capable of killing Galactus when the latter is very well fed and far beyond his normal power level.

Supporting characters

Reception

Accolades 

 In 2011, IGN ranked Thor 14th in their "Top 100 Comic Book Heroes of All Time" list. 
 In 2012, IGN ranked Thor 1st in their "Top 50 Avengers" list.
 In 2015, Entertainment Weekly ranked Thor 12th in their "Let's rank every Avenger ever" list.
 In 2015, Gizmodo ranked Thor 2nd in their "Every Member Of The Avengers" list.
 In 2015, BuzzFeed ranked Thor 4th in their "84 Avengers Members Ranked From Worst To Best" list.
 In 2017, Screen Rant ranked Thor 1st in their "15 Best Thors In Marvel Comics" list.
 In 2018, Vanity Fair included Thor in their "Stan Lee’s Most Iconic Characters" list.
 In 2018, GameSpot ranked Thor 39th in their "50 Most Important Superheroes" list.
 In 2019, Comicbook.com ranked Thor 32nd in their "50 Most Important Superheroes Ever" list.
 In 2020, CBR.com ranked Thor 5th in their "10 Marvel Gods With The Highest Kill Count" list.
 In 2022, Newsarama ranked Thor 5th in their "Best Avengers members of all time" list.
 In 2022, CBR.com ranked Thor 3rd in their "10 Scariest Avengers" list.
 In 2022, Screen Rant included Thor in their "10 Most Powerful Avengers In Marvel Comics" list and in their "10 Most Powerful Hercules Villains In Marvel Comics" list.

Other versions

In other media

The character was first portrayed in live action by Eric Allan Kramer in the 1988 television movie The Incredible Hulk Returns. Chris Hemsworth portrays Thor Odinson in the Marvel Cinematic Universe films Thor (2011), The Avengers (2012), Thor: The Dark World (2013), Avengers: Age of Ultron (2015), Doctor Strange (2016) in a cameo, Thor: Ragnarok (2017), Avengers: Infinity War (2018), Avengers: Endgame (2019) and Thor: Love and Thunder (2022). Additionally, archival footage of Hemsworth as Thor was used in the 2013 episodes "Pilot" and "The Well" of Marvel's Agents of S.H.I.E.L.D. Thor appears as an outfit in Fortnite Battle Royale Chapter 2's Season Four Battle Pass.

Collected editions 
Journey into Mystery
Various titles of Thor
Thor: Son of Asgard
Thor: Vikings

References

External links
Thor (Thor Odinson) at Marvel.com
Larry Lieber interview in Alter Ego vol. 3, #2 (Fall 1999)

 
1962 comics debuts
Avengers (comics) characters
Characters created by Jack Kirby
Characters created by Larry Lieber
Characters created by Stan Lee
Comics by Gerry Conway
Comics by J. Michael Straczynski
Comics by Jack Kirby
Comics by Jason Aaron
Comics by Len Wein
Comics by Matt Fraction
Comics by Stan Lee
Comics by Walt Simonson
Comics by Warren Ellis
Comics characters introduced in 1962
Fantasy comics
Fictional characters with absorption or parasitic abilities
Fictional characters with air or wind abilities
Fictional characters with anti-magic or power negation abilities
Fictional characters with dimensional travel abilities
Fictional characters with electric or magnetic abilities
Fictional characters with elemental transmutation abilities
Fictional characters with energy-manipulation abilities
Fictional characters with slowed ageing
Fictional characters with superhuman durability or invulnerability
Fictional characters with superhuman senses
Fictional characters with weather abilities
Fictional deicides
Fictional exiles
Fictional hammer fighters
Fictional kings
Fictional gods
Fictional physicians
Fictional princes
Male characters in film
Marvel Comics adapted into films
Marvel Comics adapted into video games
Marvel Comics Asgardians
Marvel Comics characters who can move at superhuman speeds
Marvel Comics characters who use magic
Marvel Comics characters with accelerated healing
Marvel Comics characters with superhuman strength
Marvel Comics film characters
Marvel Comics male superheroes
Marvel Comics television characters
Marvel Comics titles
Norse mythology in comics
Thor